Greg D. Clausen (born October 8, 1947) is a Minnesota politician and member of the Minnesota Senate. A member of the Minnesota Democratic–Farmer–Labor Party (DFL), he represents District 57 in the southern Twin Cities metropolitan area, including Apple Valley, Rosemount, Northeast Lakeville, and Coates.

Education
Clausen attended Augsburg University, graduating in 1969 with a B.A. in social sciences. He later attended the University of St. Thomas, graduating in 1973 with a M.A. in education curriculum and instruction and again in 1983, graduating with an Ed.S. in educational administration.

Minnesota Senate
Clausen was first elected to the Minnesota Senate in 2012 and was re-elected in 2016 and 2020. Clausen serves on the Senate Higher Education Finance and Policy Committee as the Ranking Minority Member and on the State Government Finance and Policy and Elections Committee. Clausen also serves on the Legislative Commission on Data Practices, Legislative Permanent School Fund Commission, Results First Advisory Committee, Educational Attainment Stakeholder Group, and Complete College America Alliance.

Personal life
Clausen is married to his wife, Roberta. They have three children and six grandchildren and reside in Apple Valley, Minnesota.

References

External links

Senator Greg Clausen official Minnesota Senate website
Senator Greg Clausen official campaign website

1947 births
Living people
Democratic Party Minnesota state senators
21st-century American politicians
University of St. Thomas (Minnesota) alumni
Augsburg University alumni
People from Apple Valley, Minnesota